"28 Reasons" is the debut single by South Korean singer Seulgi for her debut extended play of the same name. Composed by Sean Kennedy, Johan Fransson, Henrik Goranson, Yoo Young-jin and Kriz, it is a dance-pop song with trap and heavy-synths elements featuring whistling sound. It was released on October 4, 2022, by SM Entertainment while distributed by Dreamus, along with an accompanying music video.

Background and release
On September 6, 2022, SM Entertainment announced that Seulgi would be releasing her first solo album in October 2022. On September 13, it was announced that she will be releasing her first extended play titled 28 Reasons on October 4. On September 19, a schedule poster was released. On September 26, a mood sampler was released through Red Velvet's social media accounts. The remixes EP, including her song from the same parent EP "Los Angeles", by ScreaM Records, called iScreaM Vol. 22: 28 Reasons / Los Angeles Remixes, was released on March 17, 2023.

Composition
"28 Reasons" was composed by Sean Kennedy, Johan Fransson, Henrik Goranson, Yoo Young-jin and Kriz, while the lyrics were written by Jeon Ji-eun, January 8, Jo Yoon-kyung, and Yoo Young-jin. Yoo, Fransson, Goranson and IMLAY took part for the arrangement.

The song is composed in the key of F Minor with a tempo of 122 beats per minute. It described as a dance-pop track characterized by groovy and heavy bass sounds and featuring a whistling sound. Lyrically, it depict a character who is both "good and evil" and the way this affects the relationship they're in. In the lyrics, Seulgi show off "the menacing" side of herself, where she enjoys the power she has to "crush" those who are attracted to her or obsessed with her.

Promotion
The promotion for the single started with Mnet's M Countdown on October 6, followed by KBS2TV's Music Bank on the 7th, MBC's Show! Music Core, and SBS's Inkigayo on the 9th, followed by a performance and an interview on JTBC's show named Music Universe K-909.

Music video and concept
On September 13, a trailer video was released. On October 3, a music video teaser was released. The following day the official music video was released alongside the EP.

The music video and in its teaser images showed Seulgi portrays Snow White (as the good character) and Grimhilde (as the Evil character). On a press conference with "Tong Tong Culture," Seulgi explained that the dance performance and the music video concept was Inspired by the Marvel Universe character, Wanda Maximoff, known as the Scarlet Witch, she furthermore explained: "There are a lot of gorgeous hand movements. There are many grotesque and manipulative choreography with the dancers so that you can look like a witch." She added: "It was filmed outside of England. It captured the old-fashioned and cool feeling well. Snow White and the Queen were my concept and motif this time. Snow White, who is not too good, and the Queen who is not too evil."

Track listing 
 Digital download / streaming (iScreaM Vol. 22: 28 Reasons / Los Angeles Remixes)
 "28 Reasons" (Cifika remix) – 3:54
 "28 Reasons" (Loozbone remix) – 4:34
 "Los Angles" (Moksi remix) – 2:59

Credits and personnel 
Credits adapted from album's liner notes.

Studio 
 SM Booming System – recording, mixing, digital editing 
 SM Big Shot Studio – recording 
 doobdoob Studio – digital editing 
 Sonic Korea – mastering

Personnel 

 Seulgi – vocals
 SM Entertainment – executive producer
 Lee Soo-man – producer
 Yoo Young-jin – producer, lyrics, composition, arrangement, vocal directing, background vocals, recording, mixing, engineered for mix, digital editing, music and sound supervisor
 Jo Yoon-kyung – lyrics
 January 8th – lyrics
 Jeon Ji-eun – lyrics
 Kriz – composition, background vocals
 Henrik Goranson – composition, arrangement
 Johan Fransson – composition, arrangement
 Sean Kennedy – composition
 Lee Min-gyu – recording
 IMLAY – arrangement
 Jeon Hoon – mastering
 Eugene Kwon – digital editing 
 Shin Soo-min – mastering assistant

Charts

Weekly charts

Monthly charts

Release history

References 



2022 debut singles
2022 singles
2022 songs
Korean-language songs
SM Entertainment singles
Songs written by Yoo Young-jin